The O2 Residence is a 41-floor tower part of the Jumeirah Lake Towers in Dubai, United Arab Emirates. The tower has a total structural height of 146 m (478 ft).

See also 
 List of tallest buildings in Dubai

External links
Emporis

Residential skyscrapers in Dubai